Suau may refer to:

Suau language of Papua New Guinea
Suau Rural LLG of Papua New Guinea

People
Anthony Suau
Paloma Suau
Jean Suau
Joan Tuset Suau

Wine
Château Suau
Château Suau (Capian)